Data entry may refer to:

Data entry
Data acquisition
Duties of data entry clerk
use of Keypunch, a device for manually entering data into punched cards
the name of a department in a company or organization

Data entry may also refer to:

Input (Computer science)